Two Much! is an album by vocalist Ann Richards and the Stan Kenton Orchestra 
recorded in 1960 and released by Capitol Records, and later on Kenton's own Creative World label.
 It was her third and last solo release for Capitol Records.

Reception

The AllMusic review by Dave Nathan noted "With a slim discography, this album is an important contribution to the legacy of a good singer whose career was far too short".

Track listing
 "It's a Wonderful World" (Jan Savitt, Johnny Watson, Harold Adamson) – 3:54  
 "The Morning After (The Night Before)" (Hal Winn, Ethel Gould) – 4:03  
 "I Was the Last One to Know" (Hub Atwood, Ruth Bourne) – 3:54  
 "My Kinda Love" (Louis Alter, Jo Trent) – 4:36  
 "I Got Rhythm" (George Gershwin, Ira Gershwin) – 4:05  
 "No Moon at All" (David Mann, Redd Evans) – 4:36  
 "Don't Be That Way" (Edgar Sampson, Benny Goodman, Mitchell Parish) – 3:50  
 "Suddenly I'm Sad" (Bill Cody, Karen O'Hara) – 4:08  
 "Nobody Like My Baby (Gene Roland) – 3:12  
 "All Or Nothing At All" (Arthur Altman, Jack Lawrence) – 3:54
Recorded at Capitol Studios in Hollywood, CA on July 20, 1960 (tracks 2 & 5–7), July 21, 1960 (tracks 4 & 8) and July 22, 1960 (tracks 1, 3, 9 & 10).

Personnel
Ann Richards – vocals
Stan Kenton – conductor
John Anderson, Bud Brisbois, Steve Hufsteter, Al Porcino, Bob Rolfe – trumpet (tracks 1, 2 & 4–10)
Bob Fitzpatrick, Dick Hyde, David Sanchez – trombone 
Jim Amlotte, Bob Knight – bass trombone 
Gabe Baltazar – alto saxophone
Modesto Briseno, Paul Renzi – tenor saxophone
Marvin Holladay, Wayne Dunstan – baritone saxophone
Bob Harrington – piano
Don Bagley – bass 
Art Anton – drums 
Mike Pacheco – percussion (tracks 1 & 10)
Wayne Dunstan (track 1), Bill Holman (tracks 2, 5 & 7), Stan Kenton (tracks 3 & 9), Johnny Richards (tracks 4, 8 & 10), Gene Roland (track 6) – arranger

References

Stan Kenton albums
1961 albums
Capitol Records albums
Albums conducted by Stan Kenton
Collaborative albums

Albums recorded at Capitol Studios
Albums produced by Ed Yelin